A triangular wave or triangle wave is a non-sinusoidal waveform named for its triangular shape.  It is a periodic, piecewise linear, continuous real function.

Like a square wave, the triangle wave contains only odd harmonics.  However, the higher harmonics roll off much faster than in a square wave (proportional to the inverse square of the harmonic number as opposed to just the inverse).

Definitions

Definition 
A triangle wave of period p that spans the range [0,1] is defined as:

where  is the floor function. This can be seen to be the absolute value of a shifted sawtooth wave.

For a triangle wave spanning the range  the expression becomes:

A more general equation for a triangle wave with amplitude  and period  using the modulo operation and absolute value is:

For example, for a triangle wave with amplitude 5 and period 4:

A phase shift can be obtained by altering the value of the  term, and the vertical offset can be adjusted by altering the value of the  term.

As this only uses the modulo operation and absolute value, it can be used to simply implement a triangle wave on hardware electronics.

Note that in many programming languages, the % operator is a remainder operator (with result the same sign as the dividend), not a modulo operator; the modulo operation can be obtained by using ((x % p) + p) % p in place of x % p. In e.g. JavaScript, this results in an equation of the form 4*a/p * Math.abs((((x-p/4)%p)+p)%p - p/2) - a.

Relation to the square wave 
The triangle wave can also be expressed as the integral of the square wave:

Expression in trigonometric functions 
A triangle wave with period p and amplitude a can be expressed in terms of sine and arcsine (whose value ranges from −π/2 to π/2):

The identity  can be used to convert from a triangle "sine" wave to a triangular "cosine" wave. This phase-shifted triangle wave can also be expressed with cosine and arccosine:

Expressed as alternating linear functions 
Another definition of the triangle wave, with range from −1 to 1 and period p, is:

Harmonics

It is possible to approximate a triangle wave with additive synthesis by summing odd harmonics of the fundamental while multiplying every other odd harmonic by −1 (or, equivalently, changing its phase by ) and multiplying the amplitude of the harmonics by one over the square of their mode number,  (which is equivalent to one over the square of their relative frequency to the fundamental).

The above can be summarised mathematically as follows:

This infinite Fourier series converges quickly to the triangle wave as  tends to infinity, as shown in the animation.

Arc length
The arc length per period for a triangle wave, denoted by s, is given in terms of the amplitude a and period length p by

See also
 List of periodic functions
 Sine wave
 Square wave
 Sawtooth wave
 Pulse wave
 Sound
 Triangle function
 Wave
 Zigzag

References

Fourier series
Waveforms